This is discography of American rapper, Soopafly.

Albums

Studio albums

Singles

As lead artist

As featured performer

Guest appearances

References

Hip hop discographies
Discographies of American artists

de:Soopafly
fr:Soopafly
pt:Soopafly
sv:Soopafly